Wang Thonglang is a khwaeng (subdistrict) of Wang Thonglang District, in Bangkok, Thailand. In 2020, it had a total population of 24,208 people.

References

Subdistricts of Bangkok
Wang Thonglang district